, also called  and  is a fictional character in the Japanese anime television series Darling in the Franxx by A-1 Pictures, Trigger, and CloverWorks. She was designed as the most prominent character and icon of the series. Zero Two is an artificially-created life form who aspires to become fully human, and an elite pilot with an infamous reputation as the "Partner Killer". She is well known for addressing Hiro, the protagonist, by the eponymous term "darling".

Creation and design

Zero Two had the most labor-intensive design process and was designed to be an iconic character to act as a flagship for Darling in the Franxx. The series' creative staff came to the consensus she should be the most eye-catching character. The inspiration for Zero Two's anime design came from character designer Masayoshi Tanaka and director Atsushi Nishigori. Tanaka explained that the design team was more concentrated on "what sort of existence Zero Two had", rather than her appearance, beginning with a vague image of a "badass transfer student". The initial design concepts of Zero Two were substantially subdued in comparison to her final appearance, appearing as a small, quiet, dark-haired character, before the design team decided that the design did not work with the intended personality. Her originally dark hair was exchanged for pink to assist in marketing her as the series' icon. Tanaka adapted the original design for the queen of the Klaxosaurs. The creative team considered their goal to make Zero Two an iconic character as a success, citing the abundance of cosplay and fanart. When asked by fans, Nishigori stated that Zero Two was his favorite character in the series but expressed that he was more "attracted to her charismatic personality" rather than her romantic appeal.

Zero Two is an elite pilot originally belonging to the special forces unit with an infamous reputation as the "Partner Killer" due to none of her previous co-pilots having survived past three rides. As an artificially-created hybrid between humans and Klaxo sapiens (a cybernetic dinosaur-like species which inhabited the Earth millions of years ago), she possesses superhuman abilities such as increased strength and rapid regeneration. Commonly viewed by others as a monster, Zero Two possesses bestial physical characteristics such as two small red horns and fangs. She began to pursue her ambition to become fully human after meeting the protagonist Hiro in her youth, and frequently questions the meaning of humanity. Zero Two has a confident and assertive personality, as well as being consistently rebellious towards the collectivist, quasi-theocratic world government depicted in the series.

As a child, she was significantly more bestial in nature with red skin, blue blood, longer horns, sharper teeth, and described as having eyes "filled with hatred for the world". Growing up, Zero Two took on a significantly more humanoid-like appearance, with red blood and light skin.

Appearances
An elite pilot belonging to APE's special forces, Zero Two is a mysterious and rebellious girl often referred to as a monster due to her red horns and klaxosaur blood. She is also known as the "partner killer" as all partners who pilot Strelizia with her always die after riding three times with her at most, with Hiro being the only exception. She always calls Hiro as her "darling". Her true age is unknown but is clearly around Hiro's age, but her ultimate wish is to become fully human so she can reunite with an important person from her past, which turned out to be Hiro. Since she was a child, she was inspired by a book called “The Beast and the Prince”, which she notes is similar to the circumstances of her and Hiro. She begins creating her own version of the story but intentionally left the last page blank because of the likelihood she may have to part ways with Hiro.

She later finds out she is a clone of the Klaxosaur Princess created by Dr. Franxx. When Hiro is forced to link with the princess, Zero Two is able to mentally connect with Strelizia to save him and stop VIRM from destroying the planet but this left her body catatonic. Mentally, she continued fighting VIRM in a galactic battle in space. She and Hiro reconnect, allowing Zero Two to merge with Strelizia, becoming the Strelizia True Apus, and overpower the VIRM. She and Hiro then part ways with their friends but promise to return. In the final episode, Zero Two and Hiro are nearly defeated but they sacrifice themselves to destroy the VIRM home planet and free the souls trapped by VIRM. At some point in the future, they are reincarnated into two children.

Reception

Merchandise

Several pieces of merchandising action figures based on Zero Two have been announced. A Nendoroid, a brand of figures manufactured by Good Smile Company that typically feature exchangeable faces and body parts, was released in December 2018. Other figures from Kotobukiya and S.H. Figuarts were released by the end of 2018.

Awards and nominations
At Newtype Anime Awards 2017–2018, Zero Two won first for Best Female Character. Eric Van Allen of Kotaku describes Zero Two as "much a protagonist as Hiro" and considers her character arc as "one of the show’s best parts". Kyle Rogacion of Goomba Stomp expresses that she is "easily one of the best aspects of Franxx". Skyler Allen notes that Zero Two's energetic nature "lets her steal pretty much every scene she’s in". Tokyo Otaku Mode News ranked Zero Two twice as the best Winter 2018 character in both male and female polls.

On March 5, 2018, Kim Kardashian posted a picture of Zero Two on her Instagram profile, stating that the character was the inspiration for her hairstyle.

Zero Two became the subject of many internet memes. One scene of an emotional conversation between Zero Two and Hiro became a meme when fans realized that the animation made their mouth movements easy to manipulate and dub over with nonsensical audio. Popular edits involved audio such as dial-up modem connection sounds or popular music. The meme began when a Tumblr user posted an edit with barking noises over the two characters. The scene originates from episode 15 of Darling in the Franxx. In November 2020, a video edit of Zero Two dancing to a remix version of "2 Phút Hơn" became viral. The dance itself was taken from "ME!ME!ME!" The trend originated in China when TikTokers began mimicking the dance. The song and the associated clip of Zero Two appeared in popular memes.

See also

 List of Darling in the Franxx characters
 Rei Ayanami (from the Neon Genesis Evangelion franchise)
 Asuka Langley Soryu (from the Neon Genesis Evangelion franchise)
 Lacus Clyne (from the Gundam Seed franchise)
 Lum (from the Urusei Yatsura franchise)

References

External links
  
 
 Crunchyroll's Darling in the Franxx Page

Anime and manga characters with accelerated healing
Anime and manga characters with superhuman strength
Darling in the Franxx
Female characters in anime and manga
Female soldier and warrior characters in anime and manga
Fictional child soldiers
Fictional half-demons
Fictional special forces personnel
Fictional monsters
Fictional suicides
Fictional super soldiers
Film and television memes
Internet memes
Television characters introduced in 2018
Teenage characters in television
Teenage characters in anime and manga